Over da Rainbow is a 2008 American musical-comedy film (20 minutes), directed/produced/edited by Jay Lap, written by Shawn Kittelsen and starring Al Thompson, Joseph P. McDonnell, and Tyler Hollinger. Jay Lap assisted Shawn Kittelsen in developing the story, which was partially inspired by the former's bizarre encounter with a mid-50s musically-disinclined drug-addled divorcee. The film premiered on April 12, 2008 at the First Run Film Festival. Over da Rainbow went on to win four awards at the festival, including Achievements in Producing, Editing, Sound Design, and Production Design.

Plot

Cast
 Al Thompson as Terrier Bouvier
 Joseph P. McDonnell as Teri / Max Lightning
 Tyler Hollinger as Christopher Dalrymple
 Stephen Hill as Double Double
 Jesse Teeters as Brett Dalrymple
 Aldous Davidson as Bukaki
 Jarrett Alexander as Sheldon AKA T-BAG
 Christine Brumbaugh as ZMT Interviewer / Teri Schemp
 Dan Abeles as Televangelist

Release and reception
Over da Rainbow has had a very successful run on the international film festival circuit. The film appeals to both black and gay audiences in particular, and its festival pedigree reflects this. The film has played at BET's Urbanworld Film Festival, San Francisco Frameline Film Festival, Chicago Reeling Film Festival, Honolulu Rainbow Film Festival, L.A. Comedy Shorts Film Festival, Toronto Inside Out Film and Video Festival, NYC Downtown Short Film Festival, Dragon*Con Film Festival, First Run Film Festival, and others.

Over da Rainbow was chosen as the opening night event for the 2008 London Gay Pride Festival.

The film was given a glowing review in popular urban lifestyle magazine Heeb.

Soundtrack
Over da Rainbow features an entirely original soundtrack, complete with three original music videos made for the film. Retrieved on January 7, 2012. Music producer Allan Fox http://www.AllanFox.com

References

External links
Official Site

2008 films
2008 short films
American musical comedy films
2000s English-language films
2000s American films